Gabriel Augustin Poix (8 November 1888 – 23 January 1946) was a French rower who competed in the 1912 Summer Olympics and in the 1920 Summer Olympics.

In 1912 he was the strokeman of the French boat Société Nautique de Bayonne which was eliminated in the first round of the coxed four (inriggers) competition. Eight years later he won the silver medal as member of the French boat in the coxed pair event.

References

External links
Gabriel Poix's profile at databaseOlympics.com

1888 births
1946 deaths
French male rowers
Olympic rowers of France
Olympic silver medalists for France
Rowers at the 1912 Summer Olympics
Rowers at the 1920 Summer Olympics
Olympic medalists in rowing
Medalists at the 1920 Summer Olympics
European Rowing Championships medalists